Scutiger occidentalis is a species of toad found in the Western Himalayas of Pakistan (Gilgit Baltistan) and northwestern India (Ladakh, Himachal Pradesh). It has often been treated as a synonym of Scutiger nyingchiensis (by, e.g., IUCN in 2004), but molecular data show that these species are distinct. It is also known as the Ladakh high altitude toad, Ladakh pelobatid toad, western pelobatid toad, or Asian lazy toad. It is the most western member of its genus.

Description
A large-sized Scutiger, adult males of S. occidentalis measure  and adult females  in snout–vent length. The snout is relatively short.

Habitat and conservation
A tadpole was found from a 0.5-metre deep pool under a waterfall.

As of October 2021, S. occidentalis has only been included in the IUCN Red List of Threatened Species as a synonym of S. nyingchiensis, corresponding to the western part of its range. S. nyingchiensis was assessed as a "least-concern species" in 2004.

References

occidentalis
Frogs of India
Amphibians of Pakistan
Amphibians described in 1978
Taxobox binomials not recognized by IUCN